Caselle may refer to the following places in Italy:

Municipalities (comuni)
Caselle in Pittari, in the Province of Salerno, Campania
Caselle Landi, in the province of Lodi, Lombardy
Caselle Lurani, in the province of Lodi, Lombardy
Caselle Torinese, in the province of Turin, Piedmont

Hamlets (frazioni)
Caselle (Alseno), in the municipality of Alseno (PC), Emilia-Romagna
Caselle (Altivole), in the municipality of Altivole (TV), Veneto
Caselle (Crevalcore), in the municipality of Crevalcore (BO), Emilia-Romagna
Caselle (Maltignano), in the municipality of Maltignano (AP), Marche
Caselle (Morimondo), in the municipality of Morimondo (MI), Lombardy
Caselle (San Zeno al Naviglio), in the municipality of San Zeno Naviglio (BS), Lombardy
Caselle (Selvazzano Dentro), in the municipality of Selvazzano Dentro (PD), Veneto
Caselle (Sommacampagna), in the municipality of Sommacampagna (VR), Veneto
Caselle (Tortorella), in the municipality of Tortorella (SA), Campania
Caselle de' Ruffi, in the municipality of Santa Maria di Sala (VE), Veneto

See also
Casella (disambiguation)